Wesley Tidjan Fofana (born 17 December 2000) is a French professional footballer who plays as a defender for Premier League club Chelsea.

Early and personal life
Fofana was born in Marseille, Bouches-du-Rhône, France. His father is Ivorian, whereas his mother is French. One of six children, he started playing football at the age of six playing for Repos Vitrolles.

Fofana is Muslim. On 22 April 2021, he was substituted on the hour mark during Leicester's 3–0 win against West Bromwich Albion, while Fofana was daytime fasting for the month-long Islamic Ramadan. In the next match against Crystal Palace, the game was paused after the half-hour mark to allow Fofana and Cheikhou Kouyaté to have some fluids to break their Ramadan fast.

Fofana showed his support for Palestine after winning the 2021 English FA Cup Final by waving a large Palestinian flag, along with fellow Leicester City teammate Hamza Choudhury, during their team celebrations that took place amidst the 2021 Israeli-Palestinian clashes in May 2021.

Club career

Saint-Étienne
Having been in the youth system since 2015, Fofana signed his first professional contract with Saint-Étienne on 15 May 2018. He made his debut for the club in a 3–0 league win over Nice on 18 May 2019.

Leicester City
Fofana joined English Premier League club Leicester City on 2 October 2020, signing a five-year contract. The transfer fee paid to Saint-Étienne was reported as up to £36.5 million. On 15 May 2021, he played in the 2021 FA Cup Final, which Leicester won 1–0 for his first career honour in England. He and teammate Hamza Choudhury both celebrated draped in the flag of Palestine, during the 2021 Israel–Palestine crisis. 

On 21 May 2021, Fofana won Leicester City's Young Player of the Season award after being voted by the club's supporters.

On 4 August 2021, during a pre-season friendly against Villarreal, Fofana suffered a broken leg following a challenge by Fer Niño. 

On 17 March 2022, Fofana played his first match since his injury, scoring in a 2–1 defeat to Stade Rennais in the UEFA Europa Conference League which secured Leicester's progress to the next round on a 3–2 aggregate score.

Chelsea 
On 31 August 2022, Fofana joined English Premier League club Chelsea on a seven-year contract for a reported initial fee of £70 million, plus £5 million in add-ons. After signing for Chelsea, Fofana criticised his former club Leicester, accusing them of issuing "false and misleading comments" during his protracted transfer. On 3 September, he made his debut for the club in a 2–1 win against West Ham United in the Premier League. He scored his first goal for Chelsea on 5 October in a Champions League 3–0 win against AC Milan.  His first season at Chelsea was marred by various injuries in a poor season for the club as a whole.

International career 
In March 2023, Fofana received his first call-up to the France senior national team for the UEFA Euro 2024 qualifying matches against the Netherlands and the Republic of Ireland.

Career statistics

Honours
Saint-Étienne
Coupe de France runner-up: 2019–20

Leicester City
FA Cup: 2020–21

Individual
IFFHS Men's World Youth (U20) Team: 2020

References

External links

Profile at the Chelsea F.C. website

2000 births
Living people
Footballers from Marseille
French footballers
Association football defenders
AS Saint-Étienne players
Leicester City F.C. players
Chelsea F.C. players
Championnat National 3 players
Championnat National 2 players
Ligue 1 players
Premier League players
FA Cup Final players
France under-21 international footballers
French expatriate footballers
Expatriate footballers in England
French expatriate sportspeople in England
French Muslims
French sportspeople of Ivorian descent